Lewis and Elizabeth Bolton House, also known as the Herman and Johanna Winkelmann House and Belleview Farm, is a historic home located south of Jefferson City, Cole County, Missouri. It was built about 1833, and is a two-story Greek Revival style stone I-house. It has a 1 1/2 to two-story rear ell. It is five bays wide, with a two-story central portico.

It was listed on the National Register of Historic Places in 1999.

References

Houses on the National Register of Historic Places in Missouri
Greek Revival houses in Missouri
Houses completed in 1833
Buildings and structures in Jefferson City, Missouri
National Register of Historic Places in Cole County, Missouri